

The Princes of Orange
The following is a family tree for the Princes of Orange, a line which culminated in the Dutch monarchy with the accession of Prince William VI to the newly created throne of the Netherlands in 1815. Dates given are those of birth and death; for Princes of Orange (shown in bold), the intermediate date is the date of accession to the Princedom. By virtue of his marriage to Mary II of England, Prince William III, himself a grandson of Charles I of England, became King of England 1689–1702 (jointly with Mary II until her death in 1694) following the overthrow of his uncle and father-in-law James II of England in the Glorious Revolution. The family lineage is of note as John William Friso is the most recent common ancestor of all the current monarchs of Europe.

Kings and Queens of the Netherlands

This summary genealogical tree shows how the current Royal house of Orange-Nassau is related:

The following image is a family tree of the Monarchs of the Netherlands. Dates given are those of birth and death; for Monarchs of the Netherlands (shown in bold), the intermediate dates are dates of accession to the throne and (where applicable) abdication.

See also
Kings of Belgium family tree

References 

Dutch monarchy
Dutch